Blazzaj is a Romanian acid jazz band founded in 1996 by Eddie Neumann and Florin Barbu as FunkinLeFree. Since August 1998, the band is known as Blazzaj. The band's name backwards spells "Jazz Alb" (Romanian for "White Jazz").

Current members 
 Tavi Horvath - Vocal (1998–present)
 Gabriel Almasi - Guitar/Electronics (2015–present)
 Petrică Ionuțescu - Trumpet/Keyboards (1998–present)
 Uțu Pascu - Bass (2002–present)
 Vali Potra - Drums (1996–present)
 Sergiu Catana - Percussion (2015–present)

Past members 
 Cristina Păduraru - Vocal, Flute (2004–2007)
 Eddie Neumann - Vocal, Saxofon (1996–2003)
 Horia Crisovan - Guitar (1998–2015)
 Florin Barbu - Bass (1996–2002)
 Sasi Vuscan - Guitar (1996–1998)

Discography 
 1998 - Blazzaj!
 2003 - Macadam

External links 
 Blazzaj Official Site
 Official MySpace

Romanian dance musical groups
Acid jazz ensembles